Marissa is a village in St. Clair County, Illinois, United States. The population was 1,979 at the 2010 census.

History

Before 1700, the Marissa area was inhabited by various Native American tribes. Among them were Kaskaskias, Peorias, Cahokias, Iroquois, and Michiganies. However, the most prevalent in the immediate area were probably the Tamaroas. It is known that just south of Marissa Cemetery, on a hill at 321 Doza Creek Road, a settlement existed as many artifacts have been recovered over the years.  Also, there are still the remains of a trail that was used by the tribes as they traveled east and west. Evidence of this can still be seen just north of the dwelling at 132 Doza Creek Road. The three feet deep trench running through the woods was worn by foot and horse traffic, some pulling two pole skids carrying possessions. During the early 1700s, settlers first made their appearance in the region. French hunters and trappers ventured into the area in quest of its plentiful game. One of the first was Elexe Doza, who gave his last name to a creek that lies just south of the village.

The first settlers came to the area around 1805. John Lively had moved his family here from South Carolina and built a log cabin about two miles east of Marissa near Risdon School Road.  A second family moved into the area four years later and they too were followed by others. The encroachment of the Indians’ land had begun and, as could be expected, conflicts began to surface.  Because of the hostilities, small wooden forts were built by the settlers that afforded them a place to retreat when threats of attack loomed. One of these was constructed on Doza Creek about a ¼ mile north of where it is crossed by the Risdon School Road.  Crumbling remains of the fort were reportedly still in existence in the early 1960s, but were destroyed by strip mining. A steady stream of settlers continued, and in 1818, Illinois was granted statehood. The first elementary school opened in the area in 1831.

Starting in the late 1800s and continuing to the present day, one of the largest local industries has been the mining of steam coal.  Currently most of the coal mined here is burned to generate electricity.

Geography
Marissa is located at  (38.246011, -89.752899).

Demographics

Marissa is a village in St. Clair County, Illinois, United States. The population was 1,979 at the 2010 census.

Traditions
The Marissa Coal Festival is held each year on the second weekend of August. The activities begin Friday evening and run through Sunday night with the crowning of the Festival queen. Sunday afternoon also features a parade that begins at 4:00 pm.

The "Toast of Marissa" is an annual wine tasting event that occurs in November and is sponsored by the Marissa Chamber of Commerce and participating Wineries.  Included in the activities is a 5k Grape Stomp Run, a Grape Stomp contest, and a Cookie bake-off.

Notable people

 Warren Hacker, pitcher for the Chicago Cubs, Cincinnati Redlegs, Philadelphia Phillies and Chicago White Sox
 Robert S. Hamilton (1865-1940), Illinois state senator and lawyer
 Bob Heil (October 5, 1940) sounds and radio engineer most well known for creating the template for modern rock sound systems.

References

Villages in St. Clair County, Illinois
Villages in Illinois